Fishing with John is a 1991 television series conceived, directed by and starring actor and musician John Lurie, which earned a cult following. On the surface, the series resembles a standard travel or fishing show: in each episode, Lurie takes a famous guest on a fishing expedition. Since Lurie has no expert knowledge of fishing, the interest is in the interaction between Lurie and his guests, all of whom are his friends. Nothing particularly unusual actually happens, but the show is edited and narrated in a way to suggest that Lurie and his guest are involved in dramatic and even supernatural adventures.

The guests featured are film director Jim Jarmusch, actor Matt Dillon, musician Tom Waits, actor Willem Dafoe and actor-director Dennis Hopper. The series ran for 6 episodes, each featuring a different guest and locale, except for episodes 5 and 6 which both feature Hopper in Thailand. Each episode has voice-over narration by Robb Webb, which is sometimes bizarre and off-topic. The soundtrack is by Lurie, with several guest performers.

Fishing With John originally aired on IFC and Bravo cable channels in 1991. The Criterion Collection released a DVD of the complete series in 1999.

Production

Fishing With John centered on actor and musician John Lurie taking fishing trips with various celebrity friends of his. Jim Jarmusch, Matt Dillon, Tom Waits, Willem Dafoe and Dennis Hopper all appear in the series.

In the DVD commentary, Lurie notes that the original plan was to film in Alabama, but funding issues forced the filming to happen in Jamaica, where Waits was already on vacation. Lurie claimed that following their trip to Jamaica, Tom Waits was displeased to the point that he did not speak to Lurie for two years afterwards.

Lurie claimed that Dennis Hopper was so high on sugar during his two-part episode that he was unable to concentrate long enough to fish. Also in the commentary, Lurie explains that the choice of Matt Dillon was largely pushed upon him by the Japanese group financing the episodes. The filmmaker had originally wanted Flea from Red Hot Chili Peppers to accompany him on the Costa Rica episode.

Narration

The narrator of Fishing With John''' is Robb Webb, a professional sounding announcer who often interjects with bizarre non sequiturs and dramatic inventions unsupported by the footage, such as claiming that Dennis Hopper has "seen a map on the wall of the monks' monastery that leads him to believe that somewhere in this area is the lair of the giant squid".

Episodes

Release
The entire series is available on DVD from The Criterion Collection and features a commentary track by Lurie on each episode.

Soundtrack
The series' soundtrack was largely composed by Lurie, and included Lurie himself on vocals, soprano saxophone, harmonica, keyboards, guitar. It also featured the Fishing With John Singers (Marion Beckenstein, Lisa Bielawa, Mary Ann hart, Cassie Hoffman, Sarah Hover, Jeffrey Johnson, Phyllis Jo Kubey, Eric Lamp, and Alexandra Montano), as well as the Cassatt String Quartet: Muneko Otani, Laura Goldberg, Michiko Oshima, Anna Cholakian. Many other performers were featured, including Tom Waits, Robb Webb, Steven Bernstein, Michael Blake, Jane Scarpantoni, Evan Lurie, Doug Wieselman, Tony Scherr, Calvin Weston, Mauro Refosco, Marcus Rojas, Bart Feller, Eugene Moye, Garo Yellin, Bryan Carrott, David Tronzo, Erik Sanko, Tony Garnier, Billy Martin and Nana Vasconcelo.

A CD of the soundtrack was released in 1998 on Strange & Beautiful Records.

Reviews and receptionFishing With John has garnered positive reviews from Arkansas Democrat-Gazette, the Apollo Guide, The Digitalbits, Entertainment Weekly, and The Film Buff. The New York Times praised the series, noting that, "There is no big-bang payoff at the end of these episodes; that is part of what makes Fishing With John such an appealing alternative to the high-volume, laugh-track world of network television. It is also richly photographed by some first-rate cinematographers (including Michael Spiller, who often works with Hal Hartley). And, with music by Mr. Lurie throughout, the series sounds better than any fish deserves."

Footage from the first episode was used in the SpongeBob SquarePants'' episode "Hooky"; Lurie and Jarmusch were credited with guest appearances.

References

External links

Fishing with John at The Criterion Collection
Interview with John Lurie regarding Fishing with John
Video interview with John Lurie
Fishing with John an essay by Michael Azzerrad at the Criterion Collection

1991 American television series debuts
1991 American television series endings
Fishing television series
1990s American documentary television series
IFC (American TV channel) original programming
 Bravo (American TV network) original programming